Gabriel Arnaud (1882-1957) was a mycologist.

Works 
 Contribution à l'étude des fumagines. G Arnaud, 1910
 Les astérinées. G Arnaud, 1918
 Etude sur les champignons parasites (Parodiellinacees, inclus Erysiphees). G Arnaud, 1921

References

External links 
 

1882 births
1957 deaths
Mycologists